Solaire at the Plaza is a residential tower in Downtown Orlando. The tower is directly above the Premier Trade Plaza. Both were built at exactly the same time and have similar design. The building, like much of the other towers, has a crown that is lit at night. The tower created a dense pocket of buildings in the area around Suntrust Center, and now is a major turning point in the skyline of Orlando. The tower is the seventh tallest building in Orlando as of 2010, standing at 359 feet and is 30 stories tall.

See also
 List of tallest buildings in Orlando

References 

Residential skyscrapers in Florida
Skyscrapers in Orlando, Florida
Residential condominiums in the United States
Residential buildings completed in 2006
2006 establishments in Florida